Aspire desktops is a part of Aspire personal computer series by Acer Inc. aimed at the casual household user or for small business use. The Aspire series covers both desktop computers and laptops. Acer developed the series in order to cover from essentials to high performances.

The AcerPower S series was replaced by the Aspire desktop series in 2002. The AcerPower S Series consisted of two types: the AcerPower Se Series and the AcerPower Sn Series desktop.
As of July 2019 Acer offers three desktop Aspire model lines.

References

Aspire desktops